Chili crisp or chile crisp is a type of hot sauce, originating from Chinese cuisine, made with fried chili pepper and other aromatics infused in oil, sometimes with other ingredients. Multiple homemade and restaurant-original versions exist across China. The best-known commercial brand is Lao Gan Ma, which is based on the chili crisps of Guizhou province.

History 
Infused-oil hot sauce condiments have been made and used in China for centuries and multiple regional variations have developed over time. In southern China it is more common to simmer the ingredients in the oil, while in the north it is more common to pour hot oil over the ingredients. Households and restaurants developed their own versions, and in China "almost every restaurant makes their own", according to chef and restaurateur Lucas Sin.

In 1997, Chinese restaurateur Tao Huabi began the first commercial production of chili crisp in Guizhou under the Lao Gan Ma brand, which quickly became popular and eventually became a Chinese pantry staple. It was not widely known internationally until the late 2010s and became particularly popular in the US during the coronavirus pandemic. The New York Times called it "a quarantine cooking need". The condiment has a fan base often described as "cult-like", referring to intense popularity.

Description and ingredients 
Chili crisp is an oil-based condiment that contains crunchy bits of chili pepper, usually along with other spices such as garlic, onions, scallions, or other aromatics. It is related to chili oil and to chili sauce, and sometimes the terms are used interchangeably to refer to it. Chili crisp's proportions are such that the condiment contains much more crunchy bits than oil, which creates the texture of the condiment. It is typically not pourable like chili oils and chili sauces but instead is spooned over or stirred into dishes, and unlike chili oils and chili sauces it is not typically used in cooking but instead is added to foods before serving. Some recipes for chili oil call for making a chili crisp–like product, then straining out the solids. 

Sichuan pepper is a common traditional ingredient. Rapeseed oil or soybean oil are common bases. Vinegar, which is commonly used in hot sauces, is not an ingredient.

Flavor profile 
Chili crisp is savory, salty, spicy, and oily. Today described chili crisp as "a flavor bomb, incredibly nuanced, usually spicy, full of umami". The Los Angeles Times described the flavor as "the salty, crackly pleasure of potato chips with a just-right amount of tingling chile heat". New York magazine described it as "balanced the way sriracha is, only with more crunch and oomph". Chili crisps containing Sichuan pepper create ma-la, an "intense heat and numbing sensation" typically associated with mala. 

Besides the actual flavors, much of the appeal is often attributed to the texture.

Uses 

It has been described as being good with "anything" and "everything", including desserts. Sam Sifton described it as "magical" and "a condiment to improve all it touches". Lucky Peach listed it among their pantry staples, saying:

Chili crisp is typically used as a condiment rather than as a cooking ingredient. It is used to top many different dishes, such as avocado toast, tacos, eggs, fish, vegetables, salads, fruit, grains, peanut brittle, or vanilla ice cream. It is spooned onto or stirred into soups and broths. It is tossed into noodles or used to top them. It is used as a dip or spread.

Production 
Various techniques are used, including simmering the ingredients in oil and pouring hot oil over the ingredients. To enhance the crispiness, moist ingredients such as onions are simmered in the oil separately first to eliminate their liquids.

Versions are produced in Taiwan, Japan, and Mexico, often with local ingredients such as árbol chiles and sesame seeds.

See also 
 List of condiments

References 

Chili peppers
Chinese condiments
Garlic
Hot sauces